Kenneth Wells Parkinson (September 13, 1927 – October 5, 2016) was counsel to the Committee to Re-elect the President that supported Richard Nixon in 1972. He was a member of the Watergate Seven, who were indicted by a federal grand jury on March 1, 1974. Parkinson was acquitted on January 1, 1975.

References

1927 births
2016 deaths
20th-century American lawyers